Aubrac is a small village in the southern Massif Central of France. The name is also applied to the surrounding countryside, which is properly called L'Aubrac in French. The Aubrac region has been a member of the Natura 2000 network since August 2006. It straddles three départements (Cantal, Aveyron and Lozère) and three régions (Auvergne, Midi-Pyrénées and Languedoc-Roussillon).

Geography, geology 

Aubrac is a volcanic and granitic plateau that extends over an area of 1,500 km2. The volcanic eruptions occurred between 6 and 9 million year ago and were of Hawaiian type with fluid lavas. There are therefore no individual volcanic cones. The volcanic zone occupies the west side while the other part of the plateau is formed of granite. The average altitude is about 1,200 meters with the highest point at 1,469 meters (Signal de Mailhebiau) in the south. All the region has been eroded by glaciers during three glacial periods. The Aubrac includes four glacial lakes: lac des Salhiens, lac de Saint-Andéol, lac de Souveyrols and lac de Born. In the south, the highest summits of the Aubrac dominate the Lot valley, which lies 1,000 m below.

Economy 

Bovine breeding is the main activity on the plateau. Aubrac has its own bovine species called "Aubrac", which is well adapted to the environment. The cows are bred for their meat while, before the 1960s, they were bred for their dairy products. The milk was made into cheese in "burons" or " mazucs ", which are small structures in the middle of the pastures. Today, the majority of these structures are in ruin. The "Laguiole" (pronounced "Layole") cheese is now only made by a dairy in the village of Laguiole and resembles Cantal cheese.

The region is also known for its knife industry. It is here that the Laguiole knife is made by around thirty local craftsmen. The factory of Forge de Laguiole was designed by Phillippe Starck.

History

By 1000 BC, the Celts had occupied the region. In the period of Roman Gaul, Gaulish tribes called Gabalians (Lozère) and Rutènians (Aveyron) occupied the area. Julius Caesar stated that the Gabalians were survivors of the Battle of Alesia. Their capital Anderitum became Javols. The Rutenians, who may have come from the Danube delta and who gave their name to the Rouergue, became allied with Vercingetorix.

In the early Middle Ages, Grégory of Tours recorded an incident of a Pagan rite at the lake near Mount Hélanus. Later, a pilgrim of St. James, Adallard (a Flemish viscount), survived after a fight in the area; out of gratitude to God he built the Dômerie (hospital) at Aubrac. The village of Aubrac grew around the hospital.

The Dômerie was home to monks and the knights of the Order of Aubrac until the French Revolution. The monks fed and sheltered passing pilgrims, and rang a "Bell of the Lost" during times of snow. The rules of life at the Dômerie in Latin dating from the Middle Ages are available in an online version.

In the 11th century, a certain Gilbert, who married Tiburge, countess of Provence, appointed himself count of Gévaudan. This Gilbert had a daughter, Douce I, Countess of Provence, who was married to Ramon Berenguer, Count of Barcelona, and brought him all the rights to Gévaudan, Aubrac, and Carladès.

The rule of the counts of Barcelona in Gévaudan gave rise to a serious argument with the bishop of Mende, who considered himself lord and count of the country. After many local conflicts and the war between the lords of Armagnac's French kings Charles VII and Louis XI this country lost its true identity. However, the pilgrim route to Santiago de Compostela has always brought many visitors.

Culture

Every last weekend of August, a literary festival takes place in Aubrac: Rencontres aubrac

Photo gallery

References
Medieval latin text

Settlements in the Aubrac Region 

Albaret-le-Comtal
Alpuech 	
Anterrieux 	
Arzenc-d'Apcher	
Aurelle-Verlac 	
Bonnefon 	
Brameloup 	
Brion 	
Cassuéjouls 	
Chauchailles 	
Chaudes-Aigues
La Chaze-de-Peyre 	
Condom-d'Aubrac 	
Curières 	
Deux-Verges 	
Espinasse

Fau-de-Peyre 	
Fournels 	
Fridefont 	
Grandvals 	
Jabrun 	
La Fage-Montivernoux
La Trinitat 	
Lacalm
Laguiole 	
Les Hermaux 		
Les Salces 		
Lieutadès 	
Lunet 	
Maurines 	
Montézic
Montpeyroux

Noalhac 	
Prades-d'Aubrac 	
Prinsuéjols 	
Recoules-d'Aubrac 	
Saint-Juéry
Saint-Chély-d'Aubrac 	
Saint-Laurent-de-Muret 	
Saint-Laurent-de-Veyrès 	
Saint-Martial 	
Sainte-Colombe-de-Peyre 		
Saint-Rémy 	
Saint-Urcize 	
Salgues 	
Soulages-Bonneval 	
Termes 	
Trélans

References

External links 

Campsite La Romiguiere
Aligot-Saucisse : Aveyron, that's good!
Official site of Aubrac
Bulletin board of Aveyron
Official Site of Saint-Chély d'Aubrac
Official site of Lozère
Official site of Aveyron
Views of the ancient Dômerie (hospital)
Photographs of Aubrac cows
Les Rencontres d'Aubrac, a literary festival about mythology
Aubrac

Massif Central
Volcanoes of Metropolitan France
Miocene volcanoes
Extinct volcanoes
Landforms of Aveyron
Landforms of Cantal
Landforms of Lozère
Plateaus of Metropolitan France